In medicine, precocious puberty is puberty occurring at an unusually early age. In most cases, the process is normal in every aspect except the unusually early age and simply represents a variation of normal development. In a minority of children with precocious puberty, the early development is triggered by a disease such as a tumor or injury of the brain. Even when there is no disease, unusually early puberty can have adverse effects on social behavior and psychological development (have a more mature knowledge than one's age, feel inadequate, try to attend and establish friendships with older people, depression) , can reduce adult height potential, and may shift some lifelong health risks. Central precocious puberty can be treated by suppressing the pituitary hormones that induce sex steroid production. The opposite condition is delayed puberty.

The term is used with several slightly different meanings that are usually apparent from the context. In its broadest sense, and often simplified as early puberty, "precocious puberty" sometimes refers to any physical sex hormone effect, due to any cause, occurring earlier than the usual age, especially when it is being considered as a medical problem. Stricter definitions of "precocity" may refer only to central puberty starting before a statistically specified age based on percentile in the population (e.g., 2.5 standard deviations below the population mean), on expert recommendations of ages at which there is more than a negligible chance of discovering an abnormal cause, or based on opinion as to the age at which early puberty may have adverse effects. A common definition for medical purposes is onset before 8 years in girls or 9 years in boys.

Causes 
Early pubic hair, breast, or genital development may result from natural early maturation or from several other conditions.

Central 
If the cause can be traced to the hypothalamus or pituitary, the cause is considered central. Other names for this type are complete or true precocious puberty.

Causes of central precocious puberty can include:
 hypothalamic hamartoma produces pulsatile gonadotropin-releasing hormone (GnRH)
 Langerhans cell histiocytosis
 McCune–Albright syndrome

Central precocious puberty can also be caused by brain tumors, infection (most commonly tuberculous meningitis, especially in developing countries), trauma, hydrocephalus, and Angelman syndrome. Precocious puberty is associated with advancement in bone age, which leads to early fusion of epiphyses, thus resulting in reduced final height and short stature.

Adrenocortical oncocytomas are rare with mostly benign and nonfunctioning tumors. There have been only three cases of functioning adrenocortical oncocytoma that have been reported up until 2013. Children with adrenocortical oncocytomas will present with "premature pubarche, clitoromegaly, and increased serum dehydroepiandrosterone sulfate and testosterone" which are some of the presentations associated with precocious puberty.

Precocious puberty in girls begins before the age of 8. The youngest mother on record is Lina Medina, who gave birth at the age of either 5 years, 7 months and 17 days or 6 years 5 months as mentioned in another report.

"Central precocious puberty (CPP) was reported in some patients with suprasellar arachnoid cysts (SAC), and SCFE (slipped capital femoral epiphysis) occurs in patients with CPP because of rapid growth and changes of growth hormone secretion."

If no cause can be identified, it is considered idiopathic or constitutional.

Peripheral 
Secondary sexual development induced by sex steroids from other abnormal sources is referred to as peripheral precocious puberty or precocious pseudopuberty. It typically presents as a severe form of disease with children. Symptoms are usually as a sequelae from adrenal hyperplasia (because of 21-hydroxylase deficiency or 11-beta hydroxylase deficiency, the former being more common), which includes but is not limited to hypertension, hypotension, electrolyte abnormalities, ambiguous genitalia in females, signs of virilization in females. Blood tests will typically reveal high level of androgens with low levels of cortisol.

Causes can include:
 Endogenous sources
 Gonadal tumors (such as arrhenoblastoma)
 Adrenal tumors
 Germ cell tumor
 Congenital adrenal hyperplasia
 McCune–Albright syndrome
 Silver–Russell syndrome
 Familial male-limited precocious puberty (testotoxicosis)
 Exogenous hormones
 Environmental exogenous hormones
 As treatment for another condition

Isosexual and heterosexual 
Generally, patients with precocious puberty develop phenotypically appropriate secondary sexual characteristics. This is called isosexual precocity.

In some cases, a patient may develop characteristics of the opposite sex. For example, a male may develop breasts and other feminine characteristics, while a female may develop a deepened voice and facial hair. This is called heterosexual or contrasexual precocity. It is very rare in comparison to isosexual precocity and is usually the result of unusual circumstances. As an example, children with a very rare genetic condition called aromatase excess syndrome – in which exceptionally high circulating levels of estrogen are present – usually develop precocious puberty. Males and females are hyper-feminized by the syndrome. The "opposite" case would be the hyper-masculinisation of both male and female patients with congenital adrenal hyperplasia (CAH) due to 21-hydroxylase deficiency, in which there is an excess of androgens. Thus, in the aromatase excess syndrome the precocious puberty is isosexual in females and heterosexual in males, whilst in the CAH it's isosexual in males and heterosexual in females.

Research 
Although the causes of early puberty are still somewhat unclear, girls who have a high-fat diet and are not physically active or are obese are more likely to physically mature earlier. "Obese girls, defined as at least 10 kilograms (22 pounds) overweight, had an 80 percent chance of developing breasts before their ninth birthday and starting menstruation before age 12 – the western average for menstruation is about 12.7 years." In addition to diet and exercise habits, exposure to chemicals that mimic estrogen (known as xenoestrogens) is another possible cause of early puberty in girls. Bisphenol A, a xenoestrogen found in hard plastics, has been shown to affect sexual development. "Factors other than obesity, however, perhaps genetic and/or environmental ones, are needed to explain the higher prevalence of early puberty in black versus white girls." While more girls are increasingly entering puberty at younger ages, new research indicates that some boys are actually starting later (delayed puberty). "Increasing rates of obese and overweight children in the United States may be contributing to a later onset of puberty in boys, say researchers at the University of Michigan Health System."

High levels of beta-hCG in serum and cerebrospinal fluid observed in a 9-year-old boy suggest a pineal gland tumor. The tumor is called a chorionic gonadotropin secreting pineal tumor. Radiotherapy and chemotherapy reduced tumor and beta-hCG levels normalized.

In a study using neonatal melatonin on rats, results suggest that elevated melatonin could be responsible for some cases of early puberty.

Familial cases of idiopathic central precocious puberty (ICPP) have been reported, leading researchers to believe there are specific genetic modulators of ICPP. Mutations in genes such as LIN28, and LEP and LEPR, which encode leptin and the leptin receptor, have been associated with precocious puberty. The association between LIN28 and puberty timing was validated experimentally in vivo, when it was found that mice with ectopic over-expression of LIN28 show an extended period of pre-pubertal growth and a significant delay in puberty onset.

Mutations in the kisspeptin (KISS1) and its receptor, KISS1R (also known as GPR54), involved in GnRH secretion and puberty onset, are also thought to be the cause for ICPP However, this is still a controversial area of research, and some investigators found no association of mutations in the LIN28 and KISS1/KISS1R genes to be the common cause underlying ICPP.

The gene MKRN3, which is a maternally imprinted gene, was first cloned by Jong et al. in 1999.  MKRN3 was originally named Zinc finger protein 127.  It is located on human chromosome 15 on the long arm in the Prader-Willi syndrome critical region2, and has since been identified as a cause of premature sexual development or CPP. The identification of mutations in MKRN3 leading to sporadic cases of CPP has been a significant contribution to better understanding the mechanism of puberty. MKRN3 appears to act as a "brake" on the central hypothalamic-pituitary access.  Thus, loss of function mutations of the protein allow early activation of the GnRH pathway and cause phenotypic CPP. Patients with a MKRN3 mutation all display the classic signs of CCP including early breast and testes development, increased bone aging and elevated hormone levels of GnRH and LH.

Diagnosis 
Studies indicate that breast development in girls and the appearance of pubic hair in both girls and boys are starting earlier than in previous generations. As a result, "early puberty" in children as young as 9 and 10 is no longer considered abnormal, particularly with girls. Although it is not considered as abnormal, it may be upsetting to parents and can be harmful to children who mature physically at a time when they are immature mentally.

No age reliably separates normal from abnormal processes in children, but the following age thresholds for evaluation are thought to minimize the risk of missing a significant medical problem:
 Breast development in boys before appearance of pubic hair or testicular enlargement
 Pubic hair or genital enlargement (gonadarche) in boys with onset before 9 years
 Pubic hair (pubarche) before 8 or breast development (thelarche) in girls with onset before 7 years
 Menstruation (menarche) in girls before 10 years

Medical evaluation is sometimes necessary to recognize the few children with serious conditions from the majority who have entered puberty early but are still medically normal. Early sexual development warrants evaluation because it may:
 induce early bone maturation and reduce eventual adult height
 indicate the presence of a tumour or other serious problem
 cause the child, particularly a girl, to become an object of adult sexual interest.

Treatment 
One possible treatment is with anastrozole. GnRH agonists, including histrelin, triptorelin, or leuprorelin, are other possible treatments. Non-continuous use of GnRH agonists stimulates the pituitary gland to release follicle stimulating hormone (FSH) and luteinizing hormone (LH).

Prognosis 
Early puberty is posited to put girls at higher risk of sexual abuse; however, a causal relationship is, as yet, inconclusive. Early puberty also puts girls at a higher risk for teasing or bullying, mental health disorders and short stature as adults. Girls as young as 8 are increasingly starting to menstruate, develop breasts and grow pubic and underarm hair; these "biological milestones" typically occurred only at 13 or older in the past.  African-American girls are especially prone to early puberty.

Though boys face fewer problems from early puberty than girls do, early puberty is not always positive for boys. Early sexual maturation in boys can be accompanied by increased aggressiveness due to the surge of pubertal hormones. Because they appear older than their peers, pubescent boys may face increased social pressure to conform to adult norms; society may view them as more emotionally advanced, although their cognitive and social development may lag behind their physical development. Studies have shown that early-maturing boys are more likely to be sexually active and are more likely to participate in risky behaviors.

History 
Pubertas praecox is the Latin term used by physicians from the 1790s onward. Various hypotheses and inferences on pubertal (menstrual, procreative) timing are attested since ancient times, which, well into early modernity were explained on the basis of temperamental, humoral and Jungian "complexional" causes, or general or local "plethora" (blood excess). Endocrinological (hormonal) theories and discoveries are a twentieth-century development.

See also 
 List of youngest birth mothers
 List of youngest birth fathers
 Premature menopause 
Premature ovarian failure

References

External links 

 
Vertebrate developmental biology
Pediatrics
Sexual health
Sexuality and age
Endocrine gonad disorders
Gonadotropin-releasing hormone and gonadotropins
Human female endocrine system
Intersex variations